Magdalena Gwizdoń (born 4 August 1979) is a Polish biathlete, born in Cieszyn.

Career
Gwizdoń competed in the 2006 and 2010 Winter Olympics for Poland. Her best finish was 7th, as part of the 2006 Polish relay team. Her best individual finish was 20th, in the 2006  sprint. In 2006, she also finished 21st in the pursuit, 29th in the mass start and 33rd in the individual. In 2010, she finished 35th in the sprint, 31st in the pursuit, 59th in the individual and 12th as part of the relay team.

As of February 2013, her best performance at the Biathlon World Championships is 6th, as part of the 2008 Polish mixed relay team, and again with the 2009 women's relay team. Her best individual performance is 7th, in the 2008 sprint.

As of February 2013, Gwizdoń has finished on the podium six times in the Biathlon World Cup. This includes one victory, taken in a sprint event at Östersund in 2006/07. Her best overall finish in the Biathlon World Cup is 16th, in 2006/07.

World Cup Podiums

References

External links
 

1979 births
Living people
Polish female biathletes
Olympic biathletes of Poland
Biathletes at the 2006 Winter Olympics
Biathletes at the 2010 Winter Olympics
Biathletes at the 2014 Winter Olympics
Biathletes at the 2018 Winter Olympics
Universiade medalists in biathlon
Universiade gold medalists for Poland
Competitors at the 2005 Winter Universiade
People from Cieszyn
Sportspeople from Silesian Voivodeship